Anton Myhda (born 22 July 1995) is a Ukrainian biathlete.

Performances

External links
 Biathlon.com.ua
 IBU Datacenter

1995 births
Living people
Ukrainian male biathletes
Sportspeople from Chernihiv
21st-century Ukrainian people